Pete Kilpatrick is an independent singer-songwriter, who has released nine records both solo and with the Pete Kilpatrick Band. Kilpatrick's work is a blend of folk and pop rock music, and he has been named Maine's Best Act and Best Vocalist four times in the Portland Best Music Awards. Kilpatrick has performed with many notable acts including Ray Lamontagne, Guster, Jason Mraz and Dave Matthews Band. In 2012, Kilpatrick and his band performed at President Obama's only campaign stop in Maine.

His music has been featured on NBC's The Office and Parks and Recreation as well as New Girl on FOX. In total, Kilpatrick's songs have appeared in over 15 network television shows on NBC, ABC, CBS, Fox, MTV, VH1, and The Oxygen Network.

Discography

Studio albums
 Half Way Home
Yesterday Love
 Louder than the Storm
 Hope in Our Hearts
 Shapes and Sounds
Heavy Fire
Echo
Songs From The Green Room
 Back Roads

References

External links
 

1982 births
American singer-songwriters
American male singer-songwriters
Singers from Maine
Living people
Songwriters from Maine
21st-century American singers
21st-century American male singers